The Marshal of the Mongolian People's Republic was the highest rank in the Mongolian People's Army of the Mongolian People's Republic.

History 
The position was established in 1936 after Khorloogiin Choibalsan and Gelegdorjiin Demid were appointed marshals in 1936.

Insignia

List of Marshals of the Mongolian People's Republic

See also 
 Marshal of the Soviet Union

References